Gurdeep or Gurdip Singh may refer to:
Gurdeep Singh (weightlifter), Indian weightlifter 
Gurdeep Singh (cricketer) (born 1998), Kenyan cricketer
Gurdeep Singh (senator), Pakistani politician
Gurdeep Singh Sappal, Indian politician
Gurdeep Singh Shahpini, Indian politician
Ponty Chadha (Gurdeep Singh Chadha), Indian businessman
Gurdip Singh, Indian university vice chancellor
Gurdip Singh (professor), Indian Ayurvedic professor